The canton of Épinay-sous-Sénart is an administrative division of the Essonne department, Île-de-France region, northern France. Its borders were modified at the French canton reorganisation which came into effect in March 2015. Its seat is in Épinay-sous-Sénart.

It consists of the following communes:

Boussy-Saint-Antoine
Brunoy (partly)
Épinay-sous-Sénart
Morsang-sur-Seine
Quincy-sous-Sénart
Saint-Pierre-du-Perray
Saintry-sur-Seine
Tigery
Varennes-Jarcy

References

Cantons of Essonne